This is a list of notable software packages which were published under a proprietary software license but later released as free and open-source software, or into the public domain.

In some cases, the company continues to publish proprietary releases alongside the non-proprietary version.

See also

 History of free and open-source software
 List of commercial video games with available source code
 List of free and open-source software packages
 List of free and open-source web applications
 List of proprietary source-available software
 List of formerly free and open-source software

References

Formerly proprietary software